Dichiarazioni d'amore (Declarations of Love) is a 1994 Italian drama film written and directed by Pupi Avati. The film premiered out of competition at the 51st Venice International Film Festival.

Cast 

 Alessio Modica  as Dado
 Carlotta Miti   as Sandra
Antonella Attili as  Gaby 
Delia Boccardo as Adult Sandra 
Carlo Delle Piane  as the Superintendent 
Valeria Fabrizi  as Piera 
Ivano Marescotti as Professor Colli

References

External links

1994 films
Italian drama films
1994 drama films
Films directed by Pupi Avati 
1990s Italian-language films
1990s Italian films